The Major Arcana are the named or numbered cards in a cartomantic tarot pack, the name being originally given by occultists to the trump cards of a normal tarot pack used for playing card games. There are usually 22 such cards in a standard 78-card pack, typically numbered from 0 to 21 (in card playing packs, there is no 0, the unnumbered card is the Fool). The name is not used by tarot card game players.

Prior to the 17th century, tarot cards were solely used for playing games and the Fool and 21 trumps were simply part of a standard card pack used for gaming and gambling. There may have been allegorical and cultural significance attached to them, but beyond that, the trumps originally had no mystical or magical import. With decks designed for card games (Tarot card games), these cards serve as permanent trumps and are distinguished from the remaining cards -- the suit cards -- which are known by occultists as the Minor Arcana.

The terms "Major" and "Minor Arcana" are used in the occult, and divinatory applications of the deck as in practising Esoteric Tarot and originate with Jean-Baptiste Pitois (1811–1877), writing under the name Paul Christian.

Sir Michael Dummett writes that the Fool and trump cards originally had simple allegorical or esoteric meaning, mostly originating in elite ideology in the Italian courts of the 15th century when it was invented. The occult significance began to emerge in the 18th century when Antoine Court de Gébelin, a Swiss clergyman and Freemason, published Le Monde Primitif. The construction of the occult and divinatory significance of the tarot, and the Major and Minor Arcana, continued on from there. For example, Court de Gébelin claimed an Egyptian, kabbalistic, and divine significance of the tarot trumps; Etteilla created a method of divination using tarot; Éliphas Lévi worked to break away from the Egyptian nature of the divinatory tarot, bringing it back to the tarot de Marseilles, creating a "tortuous" kabbalastic correspondence, and even suggested that the Major Arcana represent stages of life. The Marquis Stanislas de Guaita established the Major Arcana as an initiatory sequence to be used to establish a path of spiritual ascension and evolution. In 1980 Sallie Nichols, a Jungian psychologist, wrote of the tarot as having deep psychological and archetypal significance, even encoding the entire process of Jungian individuation into the tarot trumps. 

These various interpretations of the Major Arcana developed in stages, all of which continue to exert significant influence on practitioners' explanations of the Major Arcana.

List of the Major Arcana
Like the early Italian-suited packs on which they were originally based, in a cartomantic pack each Major Arcanum depicts a scene, mostly featuring a person or several people, with many symbolic elements.  In many decks, each has a number (usually in Roman numerals) and a name, though not all decks have both, and some have only a picture. Every tarot deck is different and carries a different connotation with the art, however most symbolism remains the same. The earliest, pre-cartomantic, decks bore unnamed and unnumbered pictures on their trionfi or trumps (probably because a great many of the people using them at the time were illiterate), and the order of cards was not standardized. Strength is traditionally the eleventh card and Justice the eighth, but the influential Rider–Waite Tarot switched the position of these two cards in order to make them a better fit with the astrological correspondences worked out by the Hermetic Order of the Golden Dawn, under which the eighth card is associated with Leo and the eleventh with Libra. Today many decks use this numbering, particularly in the English-speaking world. Both placements are considered valid.

Esotericism
By the 19th century, the Tarot was being claimed as a "Bible of Bibles", an esoteric repository of all the significant truths of creation. The trend was started by prominent freemason and Protestant cleric Antoine Court de Gébelin who suggested that the tarot had an ancient Egyptian origin, and mystic divine and kabbalistic significance. A contemporary of his, the Comte de Mellet, added to Court de Gébelin's claims by suggesting (attacked as being erroneous) that the tarot was associated with Romani people and was in fact the imprinted book of Hermes Trismegistus. These claims were continued by Etteilla. Etteilla is primarily recognized as the founder and propagator of the divinatory tarot, but he also participated in the propagation of the occult tarot by claiming the tarot had an ancient Egyptian origin and was an account of the creation of the world and a book of eternal medicine. Éliphas Lévi revitalized the occult tarot by associating it with the mystical Kabbalah and making it a "prime ingredient in magical lore". As Decker, Depaulis, and Dummett note, "it is to him (Lévi) that we owe its (the Tarot's) widespread acceptance as a means of discovering hidden truths and as a document of the occult... Lévi's writings formed the channel through which the Western tradition of magic flowed down to modern times."

As the following quote by P. D. Ouspensky shows, the association of the tarot with Hermetic, kabbalastic, magical mysteries continued at least to the early 20th century.

Claims such as those initiated by early freemasons today found their way into academic discourse. Semetsky, for example, explained that tarot makes it possible to mediate between humanity and the godhead, or between god/spirit/consciousness and profane human existence. Nicholson used the tarot to illustrate the deep wisdom of feminist theology. Santarcangeli informed us of the wisdom of the fool and Nichols spoke about the archetypal power of individuation boiling beneath the powerful surface of the tarot archetypes.

Fortune telling
Now popularly associated with divination, fortune telling, or cartomancy, Tarot was not invented as a mystical or magical tool of divination. The people who published esoteric commentary of the magical, mystery tarot (e.g. Antoine Court de Gébelin and the Comte de Mellet) also published commentary on divinatory tarot. There is a line of development of the cartomantic tarot that occurred in parallel with the imposition of hermetic mysteries on the formerly mundane pack of cards, but that can usefully be distinguished. It was the Comte de Mellet who initiated this development by suggesting that ancient Egyptians had used the tarot for fortune telling and provided a method purportedly used in ancient Egypt.  Following MCM, Etteilla brought the cartomantic tarot dramatically forward by inventing a method of cartomancy, assigning a divinatory meaning to each of the cards (both upright and reversed), publishing La Cartonomancie française (a book detailing the method), and creating the first tarot decks exclusively intended for cartomantic practice. Etteilla's original method was designed to work with a common pack of cards known as the piquet pack. It was not until 1783, two years after Antoine Court de Gébelin published Le Monde Primitif, that he turned his cartomantic expertise to the development of a cartomantic method using the standard (i.e. Marseilles) tarot deck.  His expertise was formalized with the publication of the book Manière de se récréer avec le jeu de cartes nommées tarots and the creation of a society for tarot cartomancy, the Société littéraire des associés libres des interprètes du livre de Thot. The society subsequently went on to publish Dictionnaire synonimique du livre de Thot, a book that "systematically tabulated all the possible meanings which each card could bear, when upright and reversed."

Following Ettielle, tarot cartomancy was moved forward by Marie-Anne Adelaid Lenormand (1768–1830) and others. Lenormand was the first and most famous cartomancer to the stars, claiming to be the confidante of Empress Josephine and other local luminaries. She was so popular, and cartomancy with tarot became so well established in France following her work, that a special deck entitled the Grand Jeu de Mlle Lenormand was released in her name two years after her death.  This was followed by many other specially designed cartomantic tarot decks, mostly based on Ettielle's Egyptian symbolism, but some providing other (for example biblical or medieval) flavors as well. Tarot as a cartomantic and divinatory tool is well established and new books expounding the mystical utility of the cartomantic tarot are published all the time.

Mysticism
By the early 18th century Masonic writers and Protestant clerics had established the tarot trumps as authoritative sources of ancient hermetic wisdom and Christian gnosis, and as revelatory tools of divine cartomantic inspiration, but they did not stop there. In 1870 Jean-Baptiste Pitois (better known as Paul Christian) wrote a book entitled Histoire de la magie, du monde surnaturel et de la fatalité à travers les temps et les peuples. In that book, Christian identifies the tarot trumps as representing the "principle scenes" of ancient Egyptian initiatory "tests". Christian provides an extended analysis of ancient Egyptian initiation rites that involves Pyramids, 78 steps, and the initiatory revelation of secrets. Decker, Depaulis, and Dummett write:

Christian attempted to give authority to his analysis by falsely attributing an account of ancient Egyptian initiation rites to Iamblichus, but it is clear that Christian was the source of any initiatory relevance to the tarot trumps. Nevertheless, Christian's fabricated history of tarot initiation were quickly reinforced with the formation of an occult journal in 1889 entitled L'Initiation, the publication of an essay by Oswald Wirth in Papus's book Le Tarot des Bohémiens that stated that the tarot is nothing less than the sacred book of occult initiation, the publication of a book by François-Charles Barlet entitled, not surprisingly, L'Initiation,  and the publication of Le Tarot des Bohémians by Dr. Papus (a.k.a. Dr. Gérard Encausse). Subsequent to this activity the initiatory relevance of the tarot was firmly established in the minds of occult practitioners.

The emergence of the tarot as an initiatory masterpiece was coincident with, and fit perfectly into, the flowering of initiatory esoteric orders and secret brotherhoods during the middle of the 19th century. For example, Marquis Stanislas de Guaita (1861–1897) founded the Cabalistic Order of the Rosy Cross in 1888 along with several key commentators on the initiatory tarot (e.g. Dr Papus, François-Charles Barlet, and Joséphin Péladin). These orders placed great emphasis on secrets, advancing through the grades, and initiatory tests and so it is not surprising that, already having the tarot to hand, they read into the tarot initiatory significance. Doing so not only lent an air of divine, mystical, and ancient authority to their practices but allowed them to continue to expound on the magical and mystical significance of the presumably ancient and hermetic tarot. Be that as it may this activity established the tarot's significance as a device and book of initiation not only in the minds of occult practitioners, but also in the minds of new age practitioners, Jungian psychologists, and general academics.

See also 
Minor Arcana

Footnotes

References

External links 

 Tarot Widget for a Website

 
Cartomancy